Robert Raymond Wilkinson (October 8, 1927 – September 12, 2016) was an American football end who played for the New York Giants. He played college football at the University of California, Los Angeles, having previously attended Loyola High School in Los Angeles, California. He died of complications of Parkinson's disease in 2016.

References

1927 births
2016 deaths
American football ends
New York Giants players
UCLA Bruins football players
Players of American football from Los Angeles